Samson Okikiola Tijani (born 17 May 2002) is a Nigerian professional footballer who plays as a midfielder for Red Bull Salzburg. He also represents the Nigeria national team.

Club career
Tijani began his career with Collins Edwin Sports Club before signing with Austrian Bundesliga side Red Bull Salzburg on 17 July 2020.
 A month later, on 14 August, Tijani was loaned out to Hartberg for the season. He made his competitive debut for the club on 30 August against Dornbirner in the Austrian Cup. He started and played the full match as Hartberg won 7–0.
 

On 12 September 2020, Tijani made his professional debut for the club in the league against Rheindorf Altach. He started and played 71 minutes in a 1–1 draw.

In the match played with FK Austria Wien on July 22, 2022, fractures occurred in his tibia and lower muscle, and he had to leave the game.

TSV Hartberg 
TSV Hartberg joined on August 16, 2020 on loan. He had a successful performance in the 18 games he played here, but did not contribute any goals or assists.

FC Liefering 
On 1 July 2021 Tijani was loaned out to Liefering on a season long loan.

FC Red Bull Salzburg
In the 2021–22 winter break, Tijani was promoted to FC Red Bull Salzburg's main squad. On 6 February 2022, Tijani made his professional debut for the club in the Cup match against LASK. He came in in the 89th minute for Nicolas Capaldo in a 3–1 win.

International career
Tijani was part of the Nigeria side to compete in the Africa U-17 Cup of Nations, Where they came 4th and qualified for the 2019 FIFA U-17 World Cup. During his team's opening match against Hungary, Tijani scored a brace as Nigeria U17 won 4–2. Tijani made his debut with the senior Nigeria national team in a friendly 1-0 loss to Algeria on 9 October 2020.

Career statistics

Club

Honours
Austrian Bundesliga: 2021-22
Austrian Cup: 2021-22

References

2002 births
Living people
Nigerian footballers
Nigeria youth international footballers
Nigeria international footballers
Association football midfielders
FC Red Bull Salzburg players
FC Liefering players
TSV Hartberg players
Austrian Football Bundesliga players
2. Liga (Austria) players
Nigerian expatriate footballers
Expatriate footballers in Austria
Nigerian expatriate sportspeople in Austria
Footballers from Enugu